The following is a list of Florida Atlantic Owls men's basketball head coaches. There have been nine head coaches of the Owls in their 34-season history.

Florida Atlantic's current head coach is Dusty May. He was hired as the Owls' head coach in March 2018, replacing Michael Curry, who was fired after the 2017–18 season.

References

Florida Atlantic

Florida Atlantic Owls men's basketball coaches